Sum/One is an album by Beedeegee.

References

2013 albums